Philana Tinotenda "Tino" Kadewere (born 5 January 1996) is a Zimbabwean professional footballer who plays as a striker and winger for La Liga club Mallorca, on loan from Ligue 1 club Lyon, and the Zimbabwe national team.

Club career

Zimbabwe 
Kadewere was picked up by Harare City in 2014 after he had finished playing for his high school team at Prince Edward School. During the first half of his debut season with the first team he scored seven goals in the Zimbabwe Premier Soccer League.

Djurgårdens IF
During the summer of 2015, Kadewere went for trials with Swedish first division club Djurgårdens IF and French Ligue 2 side Sochaux. Later he decided to join Djurgårdens IF on loan in August 2015 for the remainder of the season with an option for the club to sign him permanently on a four-year deal at the end of the year. He made his Allsvenskan debut on 29 August 2015. He later joined Djurgården for a reported sum of 150K Euros.

Kadewere scored his first league goal for the club on 25 July 2016, scoring consolation goal in the 94th minute of a 3–1 home loss to GIF Sundsvall having been subbed on in the 85th minute.

On 27 May 2018, he scored four goals in a league game against IK Sirius, making him the first Djurgården player since Tommy Berggren in 1978 to score four goals in a single league game.

Le Havre
In July 2018, Kadewere joined French Ligue 2 side Le Havre on a four-year contract. The transfer fee paid to Djurgården was reported as $2.5 million.

Lyon 
On 22 January 2020, Kadewere signed with Ligue 1 club Olympique Lyonnais. The deal also saw him stay at Le Havre on loan for the remainder of the 2019–20 season.

Kadewere began with the Lyon squad for the 2020–21 season. On 8 November 2020, he scored a brace for Lyon in a 2–1 win over Saint-Étienne.

Loan to Mallorca
On 29 August 2022, Kadewere joined Mallorca in Spain on loan with an option to buy.

International career
Kadewere represented Zimbabwe at the under-17, under-20 and under-23 youth levels. He made his international debut for the senior team in a 2–0 win against the Comoros on 21 June 2015.

Career statistics

International

Scores and results list Zimbabwe's goal tally first, score column indicates score after each Kadewere goal.

Honours

Club
Djurgårdens IF
 Svenska Cupen: 2017–18

International
Zimbabwe
COSAFA Cup: 2018

Individual
Ligue 2 UNFP Player of the Month: August 2019
Ligue 2 top goalscorer: 2019–20

References

External links
 Djurgården profile
 
 
 

Living people
1996 births
Sportspeople from Harare
Zimbabwean footballers
Association football forwards
Harare City F.C. players
Djurgårdens IF Fotboll players
Allsvenskan players
Le Havre AC players
Olympique Lyonnais players
RCD Mallorca players
Ligue 1 players
Ligue 2 players
La Liga players
Expatriate footballers in Sweden
Expatriate footballers in France
Expatriate footballers in Spain
Zimbabwean expatriate footballers
Zimbabwe international footballers
2017 Africa Cup of Nations players
2019 Africa Cup of Nations players
2021 Africa Cup of Nations players
Zimbabwe youth international footballers
Zimbabwe under-20 international footballers
Zimbabwean expatriate sportspeople in Sweden
Zimbabwean expatriate sportspeople in France
Zimbabwean expatriate sportspeople in Spain